William of Ware (called the Doctor Fundatus; flourished 1290–1305) was a Franciscan friar and theologian, born at Ware in Hertfordshire. He almost certainly studied at Oxford University and lectured on the Sentences of Peter Lombard there, but he is not listed among the Oxford masters. There is some evidence, but no certainty, that he also taught at the University of Paris, perhaps lecturing there too on the Sentences. He was known as the Doctor Fundatus (established doctor) and less commonly the Doctor Praeclarus (very clear doctor).

Only one work can reliably be attributed to him, a commentary on the Sentences which survives in many manuscripts: only small parts have been edited, by the Franciscans of Quaracchi (1904), and by A. Daniels (1909, 1913), P. Muscat (1927), J.-M. Bissen (1927), and L. Hödl (1990). William does not try to discuss every distinction, but concentrates on the topics he finds most important, devoting over 100 questions to book 1 and just 129 to the remaining three books. Among the theologians whose views William discusses are Henry of Ghent, Godfrey of Fontaines, Giles of Rome, and Richard of Middleton.

Traditionally William has been assumed to be the master of Duns Scotus. In a work on the immaculate conception (c. 1373) Thomas Rossy refers to William as the Magister Scoti, as does Bartolomeo da Pisa in his De conformitate vitae beati Francisci ad vitam domini Jesu of the late 1380s.

References

Scholastic philosophers
Ware, William of
13th-century English Roman Catholic theologians